Common Solomon's seal is a common name for several plants and may refer to:

Polygonatum biflorum, native to North America
Polygonatum × hybridum, commonly cultivated as an ornamental
Polygonatum multiflorum, native to Europe and Asia